The Last Match is a 1994 South Korean television series starring Son Ji-chang, Lee Sang-ah, Jang Dong-gun, Shim Eun-ha, Lee Jong-won and Shin Eun-kyung. It aired on MBC on Mondays and Tuesdays at 21:50 for 16 episodes beginning January 3, 1994.

Cast

Main
 Son Ji-chang as Lee Dong-min
 Jang Dong-gun as Yoon Chul-joon
 Shim Eun-ha as Jung Da-seul
 Lee Sang-ah as Choi Mi-joo

Supporting
Myung Sung University basketball team
 Park Hyung-joon as player #9
 Huh Joon-ho as player #10
 Song Ki-yoon as Myung-sun's coach

Han Young University basketball team
 Lee Jong-won as Kim Seon-jae
 Kang In-duk as Han-young's coach
 Jun In-taek as Han-young's coach

Other people
 Jang Hang-sun as Chul-joon's father (vegetable vendor)
 Shin Eun-kyung as Kim Soo-jin
 Park Chul
 Lee Dong-shin
 Lee Jung-hoon
 Park Jae-hoon
 Hong Yo-seob

References

1994 South Korean television series debuts
1994 South Korean television series endings
1990s South Korean television series
Korean-language television shows
South Korean sports television series
Basketball television series
MBC TV television dramas